Tagwai Sambo (born 24 December 1936) is the monarch of Asholyio (Moroa) Chiefdom with headquarters at Manchok, a Nigerian traditional state in southern Kaduna State, Nigeria. He is also known by the title "Chief of Moro'a (Asholyio)".

Life
Sambo was born in Tsok (Manchok), Northern Region, British Nigeria (now Manchok, southern Kaduna State, Nigeria) on 24 December  1936.

Kingship
Sambo was appointed Chief of Moroa and Member of the Jema’a Native Authority and also became a member, Northern House of Chiefs (later known as Kaduna State Council of Chiefs) in 1966.

On the crises in the Southern Kaduna area, HRH Sambo in December 2016 said he hoped the Kaduna State governor would make a speech about the events if call for calm and dialogue in anticipation for peace.

Sambo became the founding chancellor of the Kaduna State University (KASU) when it was established and remained so from 1 January 2005  until 11 March 2020 when the state governor, Nasir Elrufai, appointed the deposed Emir of Kano, Muhammadu Sanusi II, to replace him as the school's Chancellor just a week after his banishment from Kano.

References

1936 births
Living people
People from Kaduna State 
Nigerian traditional rulers 
African monarchs